Reagan County Independent School District is a public school district based in Big Lake, Texas (USA). The district's boundaries parallel that of Reagan County.

In 2009, the school district was rated "academically acceptable" by the Texas Education Agency.

Schools
Reagan County High (Grades 9-12)
Reagan County Middle (Grades 6-8)
Reagan County Elementary (Grades PK-5)

References

External links
Reagan County ISD

School districts in Reagan County, Texas